Osgodby may refer to:

Places
Osgodby, Lincolnshire, England
 Osgodby, South Kesteven, a hamlet in the parish of Lenton, Keisby and Osgodby, Lincolnshire
Osgodby, Scarborough, North Yorkshire, England
Osgodby, Selby, North Yorkshire, England
 Osgodby, Thirkleby High and Low with Osgodby, Hambleton, North Yorkshire

People
 Adam Osgodby (died 1316), English lawyer and administrator